John Barry Mildren  (born 20 October 1932) was an Australian politician. Born in Colac, Victoria, he attended the University of Melbourne and then Texas A&M University. He became a teacher, later rising to senior lecturer and head of department at Ballarat College of Advanced Education. In 1980, he was elected to the Australian House of Representatives as the Labor member for Ballarat, defeating Liberal MP Jim Short. He held the seat until his own defeat in 1990 by Michael Ronaldson.

Mildren was awarded a Medal of the Order of Australia (OAM) in the 2018 Australia Day Honours, "For service to the Parliament of Australia, and the community of Ballarat."

References

Australian Labor Party members of the Parliament of Australia
Members of the Australian House of Representatives for Ballarat
Members of the Australian House of Representatives
1932 births
Living people
Academic staff of the Federation University Australia
People from Colac, Victoria
University of Melbourne alumni
Texas A&M University alumni
20th-century Australian politicians